DZVX (1269 AM) Bombo Radyo was a radio station owned and operated by Bombo Radyo Philippines through its licensee Newsounds Broadcasting Network. The station and transmitter were located in Daet.

History
DZVX was the pioneer radio station in Camarines Norte. It was established in 1971 by the family of Don Fernando Vinzons for political purposes. Later on, it expanded its scope. The station was transferred to new management in the 1990s under the banner of Bombo Radyo Philippines. DZVX Bombo Radyo was the number one station in the area during the 1990s and 2000s. It went off the air in 2008.

References

External links
Bombo Radyo
Bombo Radyo DZVX, bombo radyo Philippines holdings 1st anniversary/ Fernando Vinzons Voice tape interview
KBP, Newsounds Broadcasting Network, Inc.

Radio stations in Camarines Norte
Radio stations established in 1971
Radio stations disestablished in 2008
Defunct radio stations in the Philippines